Branson Nunatak is a nunatak between Mount Burnett and Price Nunatak in the Framnes Mountains, Mac. Robertson Land. It was mapped by Norwegian cartographers from air photos taken by the Lars Christensen Expedition, 1936–37, and named Horntind ("horn peak"). It was renamed by the Antarctic Names Committee of Australia for J. Branson, geophysicist at Mawson Station in 1962.

References
 

Nunataks of Mac. Robertson Land